Earlville Opera House is a historic theater located in Earlville in Chenango County, New York. It was built in 1890 and occupies six of the eight units of the Douglass Block. The three story Opera House rises above the two story annex with the theater and balcony occupying the second and third floor, while storefronts are housed on the first floor. The heyday of the Opera House was from the 1890s to the 1920s; serving as a focal point for community activities and the arts beginning in 1892 and evolved through the decades by providing Vaudeville acts, three-penny operas, and travelling medicine shows, followed by silent movies and then “talkies” in the 1950's. Then, the realities of cars, drive-ins, and television forced the small second story theater out of competition, locking the doors in 1952, seemingly for good. In 1971 the building was threatened by demolition but purchased by artist and political activist Joey Skaggs and generously donated to the Earlville community for the express purpose of restoring, preserving, and continuing its cultural function in perpetuity. In July 1972, the Earlville Opera House, Inc., assembled a volunteer board of directors and began restorative work immediately; in 1974, the Opera House was named to the National Register of Historic Places; and in 1976, the Opera House saw its first live performance in more than fifty years. Since that time, the Opera House has operated as a volunteer-based, not-for- profit organization with a dual mission: "To enrichen the Central New York community through the visual and performing arts while preserving its historic building for future generations". Patrons near and far continue to benefit from the vision, determination and leadership of the Earlville Opera House in three different centuries, particularly during the 50 years since its rebirth as a multi-arts center dedicated to community building through presenting the highest quality of artistic programming with longevity. This remains a true reflection of the artistic vision of Joey Skaggs https://wikipedia.org/wiki/Joey_Skaggs.

Earlville Opera House is located within the Earlville Historic District. It is used as a community arts center.

It was added to the National Register of Historic Places in 1974.

The Earlville Opera House is a wonderful, largely intact, acoustically perfect historic theater. Managed by a stable, well-established, community-based organization, the building is the home of an exceptional year-round performance series; three visual arts galleries; an Artisan Gift Shop featuring the work of regional artists; arts education opportunities; a workshop series in response to community needs; and a variety of cultural activities including administration of the New York State Council on the Arts State Community Regrants (SCR) Program for Broome, Chenango and Otsego counties. The iconic venue serves far more than its own Village and continually addresses the current and future needs of a large regional community by expanding the availability and diversity of arts and culture in rural New York, undertaking critical historical preservation, and enhancing the economic vitality of Central New York.

History of more than one Opera House on the current site:
Fire visited the first Opera House soon after it was built in 1890. The village with the help of Newell Douglass constructed a second opera house in the Douglass block on East Main Street but it too burned on March 31, 1892, when half of the Douglass block was consumed in the blaze.  The village rallied again and the current Opera House was completed by November 1892 on the same site.

References

External links
Earlville Opera House website

Commercial buildings on the National Register of Historic Places in New York (state)
Theatres completed in 1890
Theatres on the National Register of Historic Places in New York (state)
Buildings and structures in Chenango County, New York
National Register of Historic Places in Chenango County, New York
Opera houses on the National Register of Historic Places in New York (state)
Opera houses in New York (state)